The Men's junior road race of the 2014 UCI Road World Championships took place in and around Ponferrada, Spain on 27 September 2014.

In a sprint finish of 32 riders, Jonas Bokeloh became the first German rider since Holger Loew in 1996, to win the junior world title. He out-sprinted Russia's Alexandr Kulikovskiy and Peter Lenderink of the Netherlands for the gold medal.

Qualification

Qualification was based mainly on the final UCI Juniors Nations' Cup ranking as of 15 August 2014. The first ten nations in this classification qualified six riders to start, the next five nations qualified five riders to start and the next five nations qualified four riders to start. Spain, as the organising nation, were entitled to five riders to start. Other nations and non ranked nations had the opportunity to send three riders to start. Moreover, continental champions were qualified to take part in the race, on top of the nation numbers. The outgoing World Champion, Mathieu van der Poel, did not compete as he was no longer eligible to contest junior races.

Course
The race was held on the same circuit as the other road races and consisted of seven laps.

The first  were flat, after which the climb to Alto de Montearenas started, with an average gradient of 8%. After a few hundred metres the ascent flattened and the remaining  were at an average gradient of 3.5%. Next was a descent, with the steepest point after  at a 16% negative gradient.

Schedule
All times are in Central European Time (UTC+1).

Participating nations
187 cyclists from 55 nations took part in the men's junior road race. The number of cyclists per nation is shown in parentheses.

  Albania (2)
  Algeria (3)
  Argentina (2)
  Australia (4)
  Austria (3)
  Azerbaijan (2)
  Belgium (6)
  Belarus (3)
  Brazil (2)
  Canada (4)
  Chile (1)
  Colombia (4)
  Croatia (1)
  Czech Republic (1)
  Denmark (6)
  Ecuador (1)
  Egypt (2)
  El Salvador (1)
  Estonia (3)
  Finland (3)
  France (6)
  Great Britain (5)
  Germany (6)
  Hungary (2)
  Ireland (5)
  Israel (3)
  Italy (7)
  Japan (4)
  Kazakhstan (5)
  Latvia (3)
  Liechtenstein (1)
  Luxembourg (3)
  Morocco (4)
  Mexico (3)
  Macedonia (1)
  Netherlands (6)
  Norway (6)
  Poland (3)
  Portugal (3)
  Romania (2)
  Russia (6)
  Serbia (2)
  Slovakia (4)
  Slovenia (6)
  South Africa (3)
  Spain (5) (host)
  Sweden (4)
  Switzerland (5)
  Turkey (3)
  Ukraine (3)
  Uruguay (1)
  United States (6)
  Uzbekistan (3)
  Venezuela (3)
  Vietnam (1)

Prize money
The UCI assigned premiums for the top 3 finishers with a total prize money of €3,450.

Results

Final classification

Riders who failed to finish
77 riders failed to finish the race.

References

Men's junior road race
UCI Road World Championships – Men's junior road race
2014 in men's road cycling